The S.J. Quinney College of Law is the professional graduate law school of the University of Utah. Located in Salt Lake City, Utah, the school was established in 1913. It is a member of the Association of American Law Schools and is accredited by the American Bar Association. The 2023 U.S. News & World Report Law School Rankings place the S.J. Quinney College of Law 37th of 196 in the United States.

New law school building
A new $62.5 million law building was opened on September 1, 2015, which is LEED Platinum certified and includes a cafe, secured-access student study areas, a furnished and landscaped roof-top terrace with wifi access, and a 450-person moot courtroom.

Campus
The law school building is located in the south-west corner of campus directly north of the stadium light rail station and Rice–Eccles Stadium.

Law library
The James E. Faust Law Library (formerly the S.J. Quinney Law Library) is completely integrated into the new law school building. The first, parts of the second, and the sixth floors of the building are open to the public; materials located on upper floors can be retrieved for public patrons.  JD Librarians teach a basic legal research course in the first year.

Reputation
According to the widely cited USNWR 2023 Law School Rankings, the S.J. Quinney College of Law was named a "Top Tier" Law School and is currently ranked #37 out of more than 196 law schools in the United States. Several University of Utah law students have been chosen for prestigious internships and clerkships, including four graduates who have served as clerks to Supreme Court Justices.  Tyler R. Green, a 2005 graduate of the University of Utah S.J. Quinney College of Law clerked for Justice Clarence Thomas during the October 2009 term. Utah has the 3rd lowest student to faculty ratio at 7.3:1, behind only Yale and Stanford at 7.3:1 and 8:1, respectively.

Admissions, and bar passage
There were 1,277 applicants for the incoming class of 2012 at the S.J. Quinney College of Law, and 128 students were enrolled; the incoming class had a median LSAT score of 160 and median GPA of 3.60.  The 25th–75th percentile LSAT range was 156–163, and the 25th–75th percentile range for GPA was 3.41–3.76.

The overall bar passage rate in 2009 was about 85.5%, with 75% passing in February and 90% passing in July.

Costs
The total cost of attendance (indicating the cost of tuition, fees, and living expenses) at S.J. Quinney School of Law for the 2017–2018 academic year is $26,758 for residents and $50,816 for nonresidents.

Dean Elizabeth Kronk Warner
In 2019 Elizabeth Kronk Warner became the 12th Dean of the S.J. Quinney College of Law, succeeding Robert Adler who had been in place since 2014. She is the first woman and Native American named to deanship in the school's 106-year history.

Organizations
Campus organizations in alphabetical order include:

 Business Law Society: a student organization for anyone interested in the law and business.  Events focus on how the law and business intersect. 
 Federalist Society – The Federalist Society for Law and Public Policy Studies is a group of conservatives and libertarians interested in the current state of the legal order.  
 Global Justice Think Tank – for  research on contemporary global issues in partnership arrangements.
 International Law Students Association
 J. Reuben Clark Law Society – The JRCLS is an international organization of law school students and graduates with over 65 chapters throughout the world.  Although closely associated with the LDS Church, membership in the church is not required to join JRCLS.
 Jackie Chiles Law Society – a student organization named after the famous Seinfeld attorney, Jackie Chiles.   
 Minority Law Caucus – a student organization at the University of Utah S.
 NRLF – Natural Resources Law Forum: Open to all S. J. Quinney students, with interests in environmental law and responsible outdoor recreation. 
 OUTLaws – The OUTLaws is an association of LGBT and allied students.  
 PALS – The Persian American Legal Society (PALS), founded by solmaz copeland in 2009, is dedicated to enhancing the awareness and appreciation of Iranian and other Middle Eastern cultural traditions.
 PILO – Public Interest Law Organization. to promote scholarship, activism, and career opportunities for law students interested in working for the public interest. This includes local, state, and federal government, as well as non profits and other organizations.
 Student Immigration Law Association (SILA) – .
 SIPLA – The Student Intellectual Property Law Association is open to all University of Utah students. 
 Sports Law Club The Sports Law Club provides a forum for students interested in sports law 
 Student Bar Association – The SBA is the official student government of the S.J. Quinney College of Law. It plans student activities, organizes the mentor program for 1L students and  other programs sich as  social events, philanthropies, and intramural sports.  The SBA also serves as the Student Advisory Committee (SAC) and elected student government of the College of Law. As voting members of the College Council, SBA Board members represent the student body to the law school faculty and administration.
 Women's Law Caucus promotes interest in issues of particular concern to women.

Scholarly publications
The S.J. Quinney College of Law currently publishes three legal journals:
 Utah Environmental Law Review
 Utah Law Review
 Journal of Law and Family Studies

Notable alumni
State Supreme Court
Roger I. McDonough (1925), Chief Justice of Utah, 1947–1948, 1954–1959
Richard C. Howe (1948), Chief Justice of Utah, 1998–2002
Richard J. Maughan (1951), Chief Justice of Utah, 1981
Gordon R. Hall (1951), Chief Justice of Utah, 1981–1993
Michael Zimmerman (jurist) (1969), Chief Justice of Utah, 1994–1998

 State Court of Appeals
Michele Christiansen, Judge, 2010–present
Diana Hagen, Judge, 2017–present

State Government
Herbert B. Maw (1916), Governor of Utah, 1941–1949
Myron E. Leavitt (1956), Lieutenant Governor of Nevada, 1979–1983
Paul Van Dam (1966), Attorney General of Utah, 1989–1993
Larry J. Echo Hawk (1973), Attorney General of Idaho, 1991–1995; US Assistant Secretary for Bureau of Indian Affairs, 2009–2012
Jan Graham (1980), Attorney General of Utah, 1993–2001

Federal Court
David Thomas Lewis (1937), US Court of Appeals for the 10th circuit, 1956–1977
Aldon J. Anderson (1943), US District Court for Utah, 1971–1984
Marion Callister (1951), US District Court for Idaho, 1976–1989
Bruce Sterling Jenkins (1952), US District Court for Utah, 1978–1994
John Thomas Greene Jr. (1955), US District Court for Utah, 1985–1997
David G. Campbell (1979), US District Court for Arizona, 2003–present
Carolyn B. McHugh (1982), US Court of Appeals for the 10th circuit, 2014–present

Federal Government
William A. Dawson (1926), US House of Representatives from Utah, 1947–1949, 1953–1959
Reva Bosone (1930), US House of Representatives from Utah, 1949–1953
Allan Turner Howe (1954), US House of Representatives from Utah, 1975–1977
Wayne Owens (1964), US House of Representatives from Utah, 1973–1975, 1987–1993

References

External links
 Official law school website
 Official University of Utah website

University of Utah
Law schools in Utah
Environmental law schools
Educational institutions established in 1913
Buildings and structures in Salt Lake City
Natural resources law
1913 establishments in Utah